Boursin  is a brand of Gournay cheese.  It is a soft creamy cheese available in a variety of flavours, with a flavour and texture somewhat similar to cream cheese.

The first Boursin flavour, Garlic and Fine Herbs, was created in 1957 by François Boursin, a cheese maker from Normandy. Boursin's product was derived from a traditional party dish, fromage frais (French for "fresh cheese"); guests would take their cheese and add herbs for flavour. His recipe would be the first flavoured cheese product to be sold nationally in France.
Boursin cheese was first developed in Normandy, and at one time was produced exclusively in Croisy-sur-Eure, France, by the Boursin company. In 1990, the Boursin name was acquired by Unilever, who sold it to Groupe Bel  in November 2007 for €400 million.

Advertising
The brand was advertised on television from 1 October 1968 on, when French television allowed commercial breaks for the first time.  In 1972 their iconic advertising slogan: "Du pain, du vin, du Boursin" (English: "Some bread, some wine, some Boursin") was launched. This slogan was later modified to "Du pain, du Boursin, on est bien" ("Some bread, some Boursin, we are good.")

Flavours
 Garlic & Fine Herbs (1963-present)
 Cracked Black Pepper (1966-present)
 Fig & Balsamic (2020-present)
 Shallot & Chive (2007-present)
 Red Chili Pepper (2014-present)
 Cranberry & Spice (originally a limited edition flavor in US, sold as Cranberry & Pepper in France, currently sold as Cranberry & Pepper in Canada)
 Basil & Chive (2017-present)
 Caramelized Onion & Herbs (2021-present)

Limited edition flavours
 Maple Bourbon (2018)
 Apple Cinnamon (2020)
 Maple Apple (2020)
 Chimichurri (2022)

Discontinued flavours
 Fig, Raisin & Nut (2007-?)
 Garlic & Roasted Red Pepper 
 Tomato & Mediterranean Herbs (2012-?)
 Goat Cheese & Rosemary (2013-?)

See also
Roule cheese

References

French cheeses
Cow's-milk cheeses
Norman cuisine
Products introduced in 1957
Former Unilever brands